Jesse Hughes may refer to:

Jesse Hughes (frontiersman) (c. 1750 – c. 1829), pioneer and scout in western Virginia
Jesse Hughes (DJ) (born 1989), Canadian DJ and producer
Jesse Hughes (musician) (born 1972), American musician

See also 
 Hughes (surname)